Harrison Brian Burton (born October 9, 2000) is an American professional stock car racing driver. He competes full-time in the NASCAR Cup Series, driving the No. 21 Ford Mustang for Wood Brothers Racing. He is the son of former NASCAR driver Jeff Burton.

Racing career

Early years
Burton's racing career started off when he received a go-kart at age two, which later turned in to a quarter midget at age four. After starting to race them at age twelve, Burton won his first late model race in early 2014. His first super late model win came in early 2015, at New Smyrna Speedway. He was also for three years a USAC quarter midget championship. At age 11, he grabbed his first late model pole at Ace Speedway, and at twelve won two races in pro late models.

CARS Super Late Model Tour
The Charlotte, North Carolina native made his CARS debut in 2015, running six of the series' ten races. Finishing only two of those races, he finished third at Southern National Motorsports Park and fourth at Concord Speedway. In the middle of that season, the team switched car bodies and crew chiefs, hiring former Xfinity Series driver Chris Wimmer. Switching his focus to the NASCAR K&N Pro Series East, he only ran three of eight races in 2016, recording two top ten finishes.

ARCA Racing Series
In his ARCA Racing Series debut for Ranier Racing with MDM, Burton started sixth and finished third after almost being spun out by eventual race winner Chase Briscoe. Returning in 2017 with MDM Motorsports, Burton chased down Dalton Sargeant on the final run of the race at Toledo Speedway to win in only his second series start. He later won in his superspeedway debut, which came at Pocono Raceway in 2018. Burton dedicated the win to John Andretti, who was battling colon cancer until his death in 2020.

On January 8, 2018, it was announced that Burton would run a partial ARCA schedule with MDM in 2018.

On January 10, 2019, it was announced that Burton would drive the Venturini Motorsports No. 20 Toyota for five races in 2019. Burton won on his superspeedway debut at Daytona.

East Series

Starting with the 2016 NASCAR K&N Pro Series East season opener at New Smyrna, Burton became the youngest driver to start a race in the series. He also garnered a full-time ride from HScott Motorsports using their Toyotas. Throughout the thirteen race season, Burton garnered one pole, as many top fives, and finished eighth in the championship point standings while failing to finish two races. After HScott Motorsports with Justin Marks shut down, Burton moved to MDM Motorsports bringing his number and sponsor. He also signed an extension with Kevin Harvick Incorporated to bring in sponsors like DEX Imaging, Hunt Brothers Pizza, Rheem and others. Early in the season, Burton made waves by campaigning a paint scheme with the number on the rear quarter panels. His performance also gained attention, winning a rain-shortened race at Bristol. He then outlasted the field at Memphis the following race after Todd Gilliland had a flat tire. He went on to win five of fourteen races that season and beat Gilliland for the championship after making up an eight-point deficit going into the final race.

On January 8, 2018, it was announced that Burton would drive a partial K&N season with MDM in 2018. The first race of his part-time schedule came at the K&N East season opener at New Smyrna Speedway, where he finished 3rd after battling Todd Gilliland for the lead in the final laps.

Truck Series
Burton signed on with Kyle Busch Motorsports to drive the No. 18 Toyota Tundra for the 2016 Alpha Energy Solutions 250 at Martinsville Speedway in late October. Due to NASCAR rules and regulations maintaining that a driver has to be sixteen years of age before competing in any national series event, Burton was therefore barred from entering any events before October 9 of that year. He showed speed early, cracking the top ten in practice, but faltered during the race and finished one lap down in 22nd. In this race, Burton and Kyle Donahue (who was driving the No. 63 for MB Motorsports) made history as the first drivers born in the 2000s decade and the 21st century to compete in the Truck Series and in any NASCAR national series. Burton signed with Kyle Busch Motorsports to run both Martinsville races, as well as Dover, Iowa, Eldora, and Bristol in the No. 51 Toyota Tundra in 2017. He finished all of the races but only scored one top-ten, a fourth-place at Martinsville in fall.

On January 8, 2018, it was announced that Burton would again pilot the KBM No. 51 for a partial schedule. The nine-race schedule included mostly short tracks but also Canadian Tire Motorsport Park and all of the races after he turns eighteen. Burton grabbed his first pole in the M&M's 200, and finished third after dealing with throttle issues during the race. He won his first stage in NASCAR competition at ISM Raceway in November en route to another third-place finish.

On November 14, 2018, it was announced that Burton would run full-time in 2019, replacing Noah Gragson in KBM's No. 18 entry.

Burton would return to truck series competition in 2022, driving in a one-off race for David Gilliland Racing at the 2022 Pinty's Truck Race on Dirt.

Xfinity Series

On April 1, 2019, Joe Gibbs Racing announced Burton would drive the team's No. 18 Toyota Supra in the NASCAR Xfinity Series for eight races starting with the Alsco 300 at Bristol Motor Speedway five days later. In his third race of the year at New Hampshire Motor Speedway, Burton was intentionally wrecked by Paul Menard after Burton passed Menard with contact. Menard thought the incident was a teaching moment to not race dirty while Burton was from the viewpoint that getting passed was not grounds for being wrecked.

On October 17, 2019, with Christopher Bell moving up to the NASCAR Cup Series, JGR announced Burton would replace him in the No. 20 Supra for the 2020 NASCAR Xfinity Series season.

On February 29, 2020, Burton earned his first career Xfinity Series win at Auto Club Speedway after holding off teammate Riley Herbst; the win made him and father Jeff Burton the only son-and-father duo to ever win at Auto Club and the second driver to ever win on Leap Day with the first being his uncle Ward Burton at Rockingham Speedway in 1992. This also made Burton the first driver born in the 2000s to win in the Xfinity Series. He qualified for the Xfinity Series playoffs after scoring two wins in the regular season but was eliminated after the first round. He later passed Noah Gragson in the final set of corners at Texas Motor Speedway to grab a late-season post-elimination win.
A week later Harrison would go on to win again at Martinsville Speedway during the Draft Top 250.

Cup Series

On April 15, 2021, Gaunt Brothers Racing announced that Burton would make his Cup Series debut with the team in their No. 96 Toyota in the race at Talladega that month, with his Xfinity Series sponsor, DEX Imaging, as the sponsor. In this race, Burton would become the first driver born in the 2000s decade to run a Cup Series race.

On July 15, 2021, Burton was named the driver of Wood Brothers Racing's No. 21 Ford Mustang for the 2022 season, replacing Matt DiBenedetto. Burton led three laps in his full-time debut at the 2022 Daytona 500, but flipped during a multi-car accident on lap 63 and finished 39th. A few months later at Atlanta Motor Speedway on July 10, 2022, Burton led 7 laps and recorded his first career Cup Series top 10 result with a 10th place outcome. Shortly afterwards, Burton bested his Atlanta result with a 3rd place finish at the Indianapolis Motor Speedway on July 31, 2022.

IMSA
Harrison Burton has also competed in IMSA competition through Ford Motor Company's recent drive to train new competitors through their sports car program. With only a handful of starts, Burton won the 2023 Daytona 4 hour race opener of the IMSA calendar by a sleight 0.688 seconds.

Personal life
Burton attended the Cannon School while racing, and upon graduating in 2019 took a gap semester to focus on racing for the remainder of the year. He is a part of the Celebratory Cause. He is the son of former NASCAR driver and current NASCAR on NBC analyst Jeff Burton, nephew of former driver Ward Burton and cousin of current driver Jeb Burton.

Motorsports career results

Stock car career summary 

† As Burton was a guest driver, he was ineligible for championship points.

NASCAR
(key) (Bold – Pole position awarded by qualifying time. Italics – Pole position earned by points standings or practice time. * – Most laps led.)

Cup Series

Daytona 500

Xfinity Series

Camping World Truck Series

K&N Pro Series East

K&N Pro Series West

 Season still in progress
 Ineligible for series points

ARCA Menards Series
(key) (Bold – Pole position awarded by qualifying time. Italics – Pole position earned by points standings or practice time. * – Most laps led.)

References

External links

 
 Official profile at Wood Brothers Racing
 

2000 births
Living people
NASCAR drivers
People from Huntersville, North Carolina
ARCA Menards Series drivers
Racing drivers from Charlotte, North Carolina
Racing drivers from North Carolina
Kyle Busch Motorsports drivers
Joe Gibbs Racing drivers
Michelin Pilot Challenge drivers